"Lo Que Son Las Cosas" is a song by Ednita Nazario from the album of the same name. The song reached #2 on the Billboard Hot Latin Tracks in 1991. She was blocked by Los Bukis' "Mi Deseo" from reaching the #1 spot in May 1991.

Anais version

"Lo Que Son Las Cosas" is the second single released from the debut studio album of Latin singer Anaís, Así Soy Yo (2006). She first sang the song while competing in Objetivo Fama to rave reviews.

The song proved to be a smash hit for Anaís, topping the "U.S Latin Tropical Airplay chart", "The World Latin charts", and the Billboard Hot Latin Songs, where it stayed at the #1 position for an impressive 6 weeks.

The song won two awards at the 2006 Billboard awards for "Tropical Airplay Song of the Year" and "Latin Pop Airplay song of the year".

Charts

Weekly charts

Year-end charts

Music video

In the music video, Anaís seems to be the directors model and goes through numerous outfit changes while singing the song.

Damienn Mendez version

"Lo Que Son Las Cosas" is the first single from Damienn Mendez(2018).

Chart performance

Other covers
In 1993, Puerto Rican salsa musician, Tito Nieves recorded his own version of "Lo Que Son Las Cosas".

References

1991 songs
1991 singles
2006 singles
Spanish-language songs
Ednita Nazario songs
Anaís Martínez songs
Tito Nieves songs
Sony Music Latin singles
EMI Latin singles
Univision Music Group singles
1990s ballads
2000s ballads
Pop ballads